Omi or OMI may refer to:

In business
 Optical Mechanics, Inc., a US telescope company
 Ottico Meccanica Italiana, an Italian company
 Original Musical Instrument Company, manufacturers of resonator guitars
 Open Music Initiative, a digital rights framework for the music industry.
 OMI Rotterdam, a foundation from Rotterdam

People
Omi (singer), Jamaican reggae singer
Omi (given name) Includes list of name-holders
, Japanese politician
, Japanese footballer
, Japanese football player
, Japanese actor
, Japanese footballer
, President of the Japan Community Health Care Organization
, Japanese singer and voice actress
, Japanese scholar and writer
, is a former Japanese football player
Yurie Omi, Japanese broadcaster (announcer)
Horace Ridler, professional freak and sideshow performer  known as "The Great Omi"

Places
 Omi Shrine, in Ōtsu, Shiga Prefecture, Japan
 Ōmi Province, a former province of Japan
 Omi, Nagano, a modern village in Japan
 Omidiyeh Air Base, in Iran (IATA code OMI)

In science and technology
 HtrA serine peptidase 2 (symbol OMI), an enzyme encoded by the HTRA2 gene
 OMI cryptograph, a cipher machine produced by Italian firm Ottico Meccanica Italiana
 Oocyte maturation inhibitor
 Ozone Monitoring Instrument, on the AURA satellite
 Open Management Infrastructure, an open-source CIM/WBEM management server
 Marker beacon, a type of VHF beacon used in navigation. "Outer," "Middle," and "Inner" markers, grouped together as "OMI"
 Original Machine Interface, an instruction format used in the IBM i operating system.

Other uses
 Omi, an ancient Japanese hereditary title
 Ōmi Code, a collection of laws compiled in 668AD in classical Japan
 Omi, protagonist of the animated TV series Xiaolin Showdown
 Omi language, spoken in the Democratic Republic of the Congo
 Missionary Oblates of Mary Immaculate (OMI), a Catholic missionary order

Japanese-language surnames